Marquess of Casa Domecq is a hereditary title in the peerage of the Vatican granted in 1906 by Pope Pius X to Pedro Domecq, an important Spanish businessman and promoter of the Sherry market in Jérez de la Frontera. The title was granted usage in Spain and the peerage of Spain in June 1906.

Marquesses of Casa Domecq (1906)

Pedro Domecq y Núñez de Villavicencio, 1st Marquess of Casa Domecq
Pedro Domecq y del Rivero, 2nd Marquess of Casa Domecq
Pedro Domecq e Hidalgo, 3rd Marquess of Casa Domecq
Pedro Domecq y Gandarias, 4th Marquess of Casa Domecq

See also
Viscount of Almocadén
Palacio del Marqués de Montana

References

Marquesses of Spain
Lists of Spanish nobility
Noble titles created in 1906